Think About You may refer to:

"Think About You" (Luther Vandross song)
"Think About You" (Guns N' Roses song)
"Think About You" (Delta Goodrem song)
"Think About You" (Kygo song)
"Think About You", 2021 single by Raquel Cole

See also
I Think About You, a 1995 album by Collin Raye
Thinking About You (disambiguation)